The November Project is a free, open-to-the-public exercise group founded in Boston, Massachusetts, in 2011. The name "November Project" comes from the Google Doc that the founders shared to track their progress in November 2011. While sessions occur year-round, the name stuck.

History

Founded by Brogan Graham and Bojan Mandaric, both Northeastern crew alumni, the group was started as a way to keep working out through Boston's cold winter months. The pair made a pact to continue to meet at 6:30 am every day through the month of November.

Since that original promise, the group has grown to hundreds of members who exercise multiple times a week in a number of cities around the United States, Canada, Asia and Europe. Membership is open and free to the general public. The group employs several recruiting strategies including a blog, a Facebook page, and a Twitter account, in addition to various media outlets including Runner's World magazine, the Boston Globe, and NPR.

The group selected specific locations within the city of Boston (as well as immediate communities such as Brookline and Cambridge) for its workouts. The standard locations include Harvard Stadium for its stairs, and Corey Hill Outlook Park (also known as "Summit Ave.") in Brookline.

Locations
, November Project is active in 58 locations across the world:

Collaborations
Over the years, November Project has worked alongside fitness brands, most notably New Balance, The North Face, Knockaround Sunglasses, and Brooks.

New Balance 
In July 2013, New Balance launched an advertising campaign centered around the fitness group. The campaign was titled "Runnovation" and focused on the shift in running from being a solitary sport to a social and group-based activity. “This campaign is built on the strong foundation that we, as a brand, have in driving and supporting innovation in the sport of running,” says Hilary Keates, New Balance director of global marketing and brand management.

The advertisements were placed in Men’s Journal, Outside Magazine, Running Times, Women's Running, Competitor, Men’s Health, and Women’s Health.

The North Face 
Beginning on March 31, 2015, The North Face and November Project launched jointly hosted workouts on Tuesday and Thursday evenings. The events were held under the name Mountain Athletics and primarily focused on strength training and conditioning.

The workouts were hosted in five cities in the U.S.: San Francisco, Washington D.C., New York, Chicago and Boston.

Brooks Running 
In April 2019, Brooks Running began sponsoring November Project.

References

Bibliography

External links
 

Physical exercise